Kvinnor och barn is the sixth album by Swedish singer Frida Hyvönen. It reached number 20 in the Swedish Album charts.

Track listing

Personnel
Personnel adapted from album liner notes.

Musicians
 Frida Hyvönen – vocals, grand piano, keyboards, Mellotron, handclaps
 Amanda Lindgren – cornet, clarinet, drums, vocals, handclaps
 Tobias Fröberg – keyboards, vocals, handclaps
 Lasse Hyvönen – nyckelharpa (10)
 Ola Hultgren – drums (7)
 Linnea Olson – cello, vocals
 Mattias Björkas – vocals (2)

Production
 Friday Hyvönen – production, mixing
 Tobias Fröberg – production, mixing

Charts

References

2016 albums
Frida Hyvönen albums